António Manuel Fernandes Mendes (born 23 October 1992), known as Tomané, is a Portuguese professional footballer who plays as a forward for Turkish club Samsunspor.

Club career

Vitória Guimarães
Tomané was born in Fafe, Braga District. On 16 August 2010, while still a junior at Vitória de Guimarães (he arrived at the club's youth system at the age of 13), he made his professional – and Primeira Liga – debut, taking the pitch in the 67th minute of a 0–0 away draw against S.C. Olhanense; it would be his only appearance of the season.

For the 2011–12 campaign, Tomané was loaned to A.D. Os Limianos in the third division. After returning, he alternated between the first team and the reserves, never scoring more than four league goals for the former during his spell.

On 27 January 2016, Tomané signed a five-month loan with MSV Duisburg. His first match in the 2. Bundesliga occurred on 8 February, as he played 85 minutes in a 2–1 loss at Arminia Bielefeld.

Panetolikos
On 15 June 2016, Tomané joined Super League Greece club Panetolikos F.C. on a three-year contract. He scored his only goal for them on 15 October, helping the hosts to defeat PAE Kerkyra 4–0 by netting shortly after kick-off.

Return to Portugal
Tomané returned to his country and its top division on 30 December 2016, agreeing to a deal at F.C. Arouca until June 2019. In the ensuing off-season, however, following his team's relegation, he moved to C.D. Tondela.

As his side avoided relegation in the last matchday of the 2018–19 season, Tomané helped with a career-best 12 goals (14 in all competitions).

Red Star
On 2 July 2019, Tomané signed for Serbian club Red Star Belgrade.

International career
Tomané earned four caps for the Portugal under-21 team in slightly less than two years. His first arrived on 15 October 2012, as he played the full 90 minutes in a 1–0 friendly home loss to Ukraine.

Career statistics

Honours
Red Star
Serbian SuperLiga: 2019–20

References

External links

1992 births
Living people
People from Fafe
Sportspeople from Braga District
Portuguese footballers
Association football forwards
Primeira Liga players
Liga Portugal 2 players
Segunda Divisão players
Vitória S.C. players
Vitória S.C. B players
F.C. Arouca players
C.D. Tondela players
2. Bundesliga players
MSV Duisburg players
Super League Greece players
Panetolikos F.C. players
Serbian SuperLiga players
Red Star Belgrade footballers
TFF First League players
Samsunspor footballers
Portugal youth international footballers
Portugal under-21 international footballers
Portuguese expatriate footballers
Expatriate footballers in Germany
Expatriate footballers in Greece
Expatriate footballers in Serbia
Expatriate footballers in Turkey
Portuguese expatriate sportspeople in Germany
Portuguese expatriate sportspeople in Greece
Portuguese expatriate sportspeople in Serbia
Portuguese expatriate sportspeople in Turkey